Lobstering may refer to one of the following:

Lobster fishing
Caridoid escape reaction, swimming backwards by frightened shrimp